Aaron Francis Jeavons (born 23 April 1989) is an English cricketer.  Jeavons is a left-handed batsman who bowls right-arm off break.  He was born in Stafford, Staffordshire and educated at Walton High School in Stafford.

While studying for his degree at Oxford Brookes University, Jeavons made a single first-class appearance for Oxford MCCU against Middlesex in 2010.  In this match, he scored 62 runs in the Oxford MCCU first-innings, before being dismissed by Ravi Patel.  In their second-innings, he was dismissed for 4 runs by Thomas Hampton.  During the 2010 season, Jeavons also made his debut for Staffordshire in the Minor Counties Championship against Suffolk.  To date he has made ten Minor Counties Championship appearances and a single MCCA Knockout Trophy appearance, which was made against Northumberland in 2011.

References

External links
Aaron Jeavons at ESPNcricinfo
Aaron Jeavons at CricketArchive

1989 births
Living people
Sportspeople from Stafford
Alumni of Oxford Brookes University
English cricketers
Oxford MCCU cricketers
Staffordshire cricketers